Windermere Airport  was located  southeast of Windermere, Ontario, Canada.

See also
 Lake Rosseau/Arthurlie Bay Water Aerodrome
 Lake Rosseau/Cameron Bay Water Aerodrome
 Lake Rosseau/Morgan Bay Water Aerodrome
 Lake Rosseau/Windermere Water Aerodrome

References

Defunct airports in Ontario